The Australian cricket team in England in 1886 played 27 first-class matches including 3 Tests which were all won by England.

Test match summary

First Test

Second Test

Third Test

Annual reviews
 James Lillywhite's Cricketers' Annual (Red Lilly) 1887
 Wisden Cricketers' Almanack 1887

Further reading
 Derek Birley, A Social History of English Cricket, Aurum Press, 1999
 Bill Frindall, The Wisden Book of Test Cricket 1877-1978, Wisden, 1979
 Chris Harte, A History of Australian Cricket, Andre Deutsch, 1993
 Ray Robinson, On Top Down Under, Cassell, 1975

External links
 Australia in England 1886 at CricketArchive
 Australia in England, 1886 at Cricinfo
 Australia to England 1886 at Test Cricket Tours

1886 in Australian cricket
1886 in English cricket
International cricket competitions from 1844 to 1888
1886
English cricket seasons in the 19th century
1886